Gladstone Bailey "Skip" Adams III (born July 26, 1952, in Baltimore) is an American Episcopal bishop. Between 2016 and 2019, he served as the Provisional Bishop of the Episcopal Church in South Carolina. He previously served as Bishop of Central New York from 2001 to 2016.

Ordained ministry
Adams was ordained priest in 1980 in the Diocese of Maryland. He then served as curate at St Peter's Church in Ellicott City, Maryland, while in 1982, became rector of St Paul's Church in Lancaster, New Hampshire. He then became rector of St Thomas' Church in Chesapeake, Vermont. In 1994, he became rector of St James' Church in Skaneateles, New York. On June 1, 2001, Adams was elected the tenth bishop of the Diocese of Central New York. He is the 972nd bishop to be consecrated in The Episcopal Church. He officially retired from that position on October 31, 2016.

In June 2016, Adams was nominated as the next provisional bishop of the Episcopal Church in South Carolina. On September 10, 2016, he was officially elected and installed as provisional bishop. He retired in December 2019.

See also
 List of Episcopal bishops of the United States
 Historical list of the Episcopal bishops of the United States

References

Living people
Episcopal bishops of South Carolina
1952 births
Religious leaders from Baltimore
Episcopal bishops of Central New York